Patrick Dytko (born March 28, 1994 in Völklingen) is a Polish footballer who plays for SSVg Velbert.

Career

On 14 July 2016 he signed a contract with SSVg Velbert.

National team
He is a part of  Poland national under-20 football team

Biography 
His parents emigrated in 1989 from Poland (near to Katowice) to Völklingen, Germany. In 2010, he moved to Dortmund an finally in 2013 to Gliwice, Poland. He holds both, Polish and German citizenship.

References

External links
 

1994 births
Living people
People from Völklingen
Footballers from Saarland
Polish footballers
1. FC Saarbrücken players
Borussia Dortmund players
Piast Gliwice players
Association football defenders